A labio-palatalized sound is one that is simultaneously labialized and palatalized. Typically the roundedness is compressed, like , rather than protruded like . If such sounds pattern with other, labialized, consonants, they may instead be transcribed as palatalized consonants plus labialization, as with the  =  of Abkhaz or the  =  of Akan.

In Russian,  and  trigger labialization of any preceding consonant, including palatalized consonants, so that нёс 'he carried' is phonetically .

Iaai has a voiceless labialized palatal approximant .

Labial–palatal consonants

However, the closest sounds attested from the world's languages are the labial–postalveolar consonants of Yélî Dnye in New Guinea, which are sometimes transcribed as labial–palatals.

See also
Labio-palatal approximant

References

Place of articulation
Assimilation (linguistics)
Secondary articulation